Richard E. Myers (born October 29, 1934) is an American politician in the state of Iowa.

Myers was born in Iowa City, Iowa. He attended Iowa State University, the University of Iowa, and Kirkwood Community College and is a businessman. A Democrat, he served in the Iowa House of Representatives from 1994 to 2005 (49th district from 1994 to 2003 and 30th district in 2003). Myers was first elected to the state house in a February 1994 special election called after Robert Dvorsky resigned to contest a state senate seat. During the Democratic Party primaries later that year, Myers defeated David Johnson and won his first full term as a state representative.

References

1934 births
Living people
People from Iowa City, Iowa
Iowa State University alumni
University of Iowa alumni
Kirkwood Community College alumni
Businesspeople from Iowa
Democratic Party members of the Iowa House of Representatives